Nej Adamson (born 23 December 1958), also credited as Nejdet Salih, is a British actor.

Career
Born in London, Adamson is of Turkish Cypriot descent. He played Ali Osman in the BBC soap opera, EastEnders, a role he played from the series' inception in 1985 until 1989. During his time on the show his character battled with the loss of a child, gambling addiction, the breakdown of his marriage to Sue (Sandy Ratcliff) and her subsequent mental health problems. During EastEnders he was credited as Nejdet Salih, but after his departure in 1989, he changed his name to Nej Adamson.

Other television credits include Auf Wiedersehen, Pet, Doctor Who, Wall of Silence and in 2004 he appeared in the comedy sketch show Bo' Selecta!, where he played his EastEnders alias, Ali Osman, in a spoof sketch. He also featured in the 1992 film Carry On Columbus and in 2003 he played a short sailor in the Disney film Pirates of the Caribbean: The Curse of the Black Pearl and its sequel Pirates of the Caribbean: Dead Man's Chest (2006).

Adamson believes he has been typecast due to his role in EastEnders. On the show's 25th anniversary in 2010, he commented, "I have had to live with Ali for 25 years. I'm just trying to get on with my life. I don't give interviews. I am still acting but it is hard when to everyone I'm still Ali from the cafe."

Personal life
During the 1980s, he dated Linda Davidson, his co-star on EastEnders who played Mary Smith. Adamson married his drama school sweetheart, Susan Stevens, in 1989. The marriage ended in 1990 when Adamson briefly moved to Hollywood.

References

External links 

 https://web.archive.org/web/20130516135952/http://nejadamson.co.uk/

1958 births
English people of Turkish Cypriot descent
English male film actors
English male soap opera actors
Living people
Male actors from London